Spadola is a municipality (comune) in the Province of Vibo Valentia in the Italian region Calabria, located about  southwest of Catanzaro and about  southeast of Vibo Valentia.

Spadola borders the following municipalities: Brognaturo, Gerocarne, Serra San Bruno, Simbario, Sorianello, Stilo.

Demographic evolution 
In 1961 Spadola had just 937 inhabitants. But in the year 1971 it raised down to 797 inhabitants. Many families had emigrated to the Palatinate town of Zweibrücken for founding a pizzeria very popular at this time.

References

Cities and towns in Calabria